Tim Stefan Kühne (born 15 August 1980, in Wiesbaden) is a German football coach and former football midfielder.

References

External links
 

1980 births
Living people
German footballers
FC Carl Zeiss Jena players
Rot-Weiss Essen players
Holstein Kiel players
1. FSV Mainz 05 players
SC Preußen Münster players
2. Bundesliga players
3. Liga players
Sportspeople from Wiesbaden
Association football midfielders
Footballers from Hesse
Holstein Kiel II players